The Karachi Institute of Power Engineering, commonly known as KINPOE,  is a post-graduate applied science school of the Institute of Engineering and Applied Sciences. Established by the  Pakistan Atomic Energy Commission (PAEC) in 1993 with cooperation with the NED University of Engineering and Technology in Karachi, the school grants the post-graduate degrees and training certifications in power engineering related disciplines.  The school is located near the vicinity of the Karachi Nuclear Power Complex (KANUPP-II) near at Paradise Point in Karachi, Pakistan.

See also

 List of Universities in Pakistan

References

External links
 KANUPP Institute of Nuclear Power Engineering - Official site

Engineering universities and colleges in Pakistan
Universities and colleges in Karachi
Constituent institutions of Pakistan Atomic Energy Commission
Engineering research institutes
Pakistan Institute of Engineering and Applied Sciences